Virginio Rognoni (5 August 1924 – 20 September 2022) was an Italian politician, who was a prominent member of Christian Democracy. He was several times Interior Minister, Minister of Defense and Minister of Justice. From 2002 to 2006 he was vice-president of the High Council of the Judiciary.

Biography
As a student at the historic Collegio Ghislieri, in November 1947 he obtained a degree in law from the University of Pavia. He studied at Yale University between 1949 and 1950 and also worked as a lawyer.

Rognoni began his political career in local government, serving as a city councillor in Pavia from 1960 to 1964, and from 1964 to 1967 as deputy mayor and as councillor for town planning. He then entered national politics, and was elected member of the Chamber of Deputies for seven consecutive terms (1968–1994).

Rognoni was Minister of the Interior from 1978 to 1983, of Justice (1986–1987) and Minister of Defence (1990–1992): he faced the terrorism and he solved the kidnapping of James Lee Dozier by the hand of Brgate Rosse. He was criticized by the Italian Communist Party while Minister of the Interior for failing to protect General Carlo Alberto Dalla Chiesa, who was killed on the same day in which he asked Rognoni to meet him.

From 2002 until he retired in 2006 he was vice-president of the High Council of the Judiciary (Consiglio Superiore della Magistratura).

Rognoni died in Pavia on 20 September 2022, at the age of 98.

References

External links

1924 births
2022 deaths
20th-century Italian politicians
People from the Province of Milan
Yale University alumni
University of Pavia alumni
Academic staff of the University of Pavia
Christian Democracy (Italy) politicians
Italian Ministers of the Interior
Italian Ministers of Defence
Deputies of Legislature V of Italy
Deputies of Legislature VI of Italy
Deputies of Legislature VIII of Italy
Deputies of Legislature IX of Italy
Deputies of Legislature X of Italy
Deputies of Legislature XI of Italy
20th-century Italian lawyers
Italian expatriates in the United States